Fulford is an English surname that derives from any of the places called "Fulford" such as in Devon, Somerset, Staffordshire and Yorkshire. People with the name include:

 Adrian Fulford, Lord Justice Fulford, British judge
 Alicia Fulford-Wierzbicki, New Zealand actress
 Christopher Fulford, British actor
 Francis Fulford (landowner), English landowner and reality TV star of The F***ing Fulfords
 George Taylor Fulford, Canadian politician
 Henry English Fulford, aka Harry English Fulford, (1859–1929), British diplomat in China
 James Fulford (1841–1922), Australian politician
 Margaret Hannah Fulford (1904–1999), American botanist
 Michael Fulford, British archaeologist
 Millie Hughes-Fulford, American astronaut
 Robert Fulford (journalist), Canadian journalist
 Robert Fulford (croquet player)
 Robert C. Fulford, US osteopathic physician
 John Fulford (died 1518), priest
 John Fulford (captain) of HMS Ganges (1821) under Rear-Admiral Baynes
 Fulford Harbour, British Columbia, named for Captain Fulford

References

See also
 Fulford (disambiguation)
 Fulton (surname)